Indian tobacco may refer to:

Kinnikinnick, a smoking product made of mixture of leaves and bark
Lobelia inflata, a species of Lobelia native to eastern North America
Nicotiana quadrivalvis, a species of tobacco native to the Western United States